Peter Aeschlimann (born July 12, 1946) is a retired Swiss professional ice hockey player who represented the Swiss national team at the 1972 Winter Olympics. He is the son of Roger Aeschlimann

References

External links
Peter Aeschlimann's stats at Sports-Reference.com

Living people
1946 births
Ice hockey players at the 1972 Winter Olympics
Olympic ice hockey players of Switzerland
HC Lugano players
Ice hockey people from Bern